Chess on a really big board is a large chess variant invented by Ralph Betza around 1996. It is played on a 16×16 chessboard with 16 pieces (on the back rank) and 16 pawns (on the second rank) per player. Since such a board can be constructed by pushing together four standard 8×8 boards, Betza also gave this variant the alternative names of four-board chess or chess on four boards.

Game description
The standard rules of chess apply except in the following cases:
 The game is played on a 16×16 board with the starting position shown above.
 An unmoved pawn can move one step, up to the middle of the board (in the case of the 16×16 board, the eighth rank), or anything in between. Thus, 1.i8 is a legal opening move, and so are 1.i3, 1.i4, 1.i5, 1.i6, and 1.i7. Once it has moved for the first time, it can only make one step at a time. (In the case of an 8×8 board, this is exactly the same as in standard chess). Such a long initial pawn move allows the moving pawn to be captured en passant by an enemy pawn as if it had stopped on any one of the squares it had passed through.
 In castling, the rook moves the same distance as it does in chess. Thus, the king moves further; if it castles kingside, it ends on the second-rightmost file, and if it castles queenside, it ends on the third-leftmost file. On the 16×16 board, 0-0 leaves the rook on the n-file and the king on the o-file, and 0-0-0 leaves the rook on the d-file and the king on the c-file.
 The 50-move rule becomes at least a 100-move rule. Generally, if each of the board's dimensions is multiplied by n, the number of non-capturing or non-pawn moves allowable before draw claims become possible must also be multiplied by at least n.
 There are extra fairy chess pieces that move differently, although the orthodox pieces are retained. Their movements are given below using Ralph Betza's "funny notation". In physical play, these six types of fairy pieces may be represented by pieces from mismatched chess sets. Note that Betza did not specify icons or designs for the fairy pieces for diagrams, instead using letters to represent them: the diagrams here use common renderings for the archbishop and chancellor, an inverted knight for the rose, and Omega Chess pieces for the remaining three fairy piece types.

Betza included the rose in his initial setup because it is a piece especially suited for a large board: it cannot display its full power on boards smaller than 13×13. Furthermore, its already large move still cannot reach all the way across the board, contributing to the large feeling of the game along with the ability of the riders to attack from a large distance away.

History
Chess on a really big board was created as an outgrowth of Betza's ideas on three-dimensional chess, after he noted that an 8×8×8 board for 3D chess would have 512 spaces, more than any large version of chess that had previously been invented; he then considered two-dimensional very large (or, in his word, "huge") chess games, mainly on the 16×16 board because such a board requires no non-standard equipment to construct, and while much larger than the 8×8 board, it was not so big as to make an unplayable game. This idea eventually came full circle in the development of the 16×16×16 three-dimensional version of chess on a really big board, which he called "impossibly large".

Gameplay
Betza described his choice of pieces as "a very basic and logical selection of the fundamental geometrical moves, except for my idiosyncratic insistence on including the Rose in the lineup of pieces. These are largely the basic units of chess, and anybody who designs a [16×16] game with 32 pieces is bound to come up with something reasonably similar, at least if they want it to be like chess but a bit less tactical." In fact, his original plan was to include the WA along with the complementary FD, but this leaves the c- and n-pawns undefended in the initial position. His final assessment was that the game was "rather chesslike".

Betza divided the pieces into three classes: seven long-range pieces (the rooks, bishops, queen, archbishop, and chancellor), two mid-range pieces (the rose and superknight), and six short-range pieces (the knights, FDs, and WFAs). He opined that the short-range pieces, though the weakest, were crucial as they take time to get into the action, but are very important for opening up specific lines for attacks.

Sample opening phase of a game

The following sample game fragment was constructed by Betza.
1.i8 i9
2.Qp9
The 16×16 analogue to the Wayward Queen Attack (in orthodox chess, 1.e4 e5 2.Qh5). On such a large board, this opening move becomes much sounder, as it is more difficult to attack the queen, and from this position it bears down onto the centre from a long distance.
2...h10
3.j8 Oh11
Black defends his i-pawn; White attacks it again (her j-pawn being defended by the chancellor on j1); Black defends it again, moving his rose from f16 via e14 and f12 to h11, where it defends the pawn on i9. Trading pawns would be disadvantageous and lead to the loss of a tempo by the initiator, but at some point White's chancellor must be developed.

Currently, White has no immediate threats. Attacks on Black's h-pawn with Bb4 (moving the d-pawn away first), or his rose with Bo4 (moving the m-pawn away first) are easy to counter. Hence she decides to bring a short-range piece to attack, though this will take several turns.
4.Ji4 Ai15
5.Jh6 Ak14
Attacking White's queen.
6.Qp10 Ji13
7.p8!?
Threatening to lift the king's rook to the h-file to contest the centre.
7...An11!?
Continuing to attack White's queen. This region could also be used as an advanced base: the n11 square can easily be defended by the rose or the m-pawn, and a natural follow-up would be 8...Qn10.
8.Ql6 Ak8
The White queen retreats and attacks the Black i-pawn again, but Black defends the pawn with the archbishop while attacking the queen again. The archbishop itself, though attacked by White's superknight, is protected by Black's rose.
9.Qo3
If 9.Qk7, then 9...Al9 may win a pawn.
9...Ql12
Threatening 10...Al6.

Sample games

The following are some of the only complete games of chess on a really big board played on The Chess Variant Pages, and are not intended as representative examples of good play.

Game 1
White: John Davis  Black: Georg SpenglerGame Courier 2015
1.i8 k9 2.j7 Bd8 3.Ji4 Wk14 4.k6 j10 5.d5 Nn14 6.Of7 Ba11 7.Ci3 Bxi3 8.hxi3 l10 9.Wk3 Nm12 10.Ba15 Wf14 11.Wd3 g13 12.De1 h12 13.e6 Dn14 14.l5 Wf12 15.Nd2 Jj13 16.m4 Cl15 17.Bp5 f13 18.n7 Nc14 19.Bo6 Bg14 20.Bp7 Bn7 21.Bxj13 Ax13 22.Jl6 Ai12 23.Dm2 0-0 24.De3 Ag14 25.Nf1 i11 26.Dg3 Wh10 27.Ah3 Wj8 28.Ji4 Ne13 29.Wh5 Dc14 30.Dk2 e14 31.Nm2 Ng12 32.Nl4 Oi13 33.Nj5 Dd13 34.Nh6 De12 35.Dg5 Bj11 36.Ne3 Bxf7 37.exf7 Qa9+ 38.Qh2 Qxa5 39.Nc4 Qxd5 40.b3 d13 41.Af4 Qd12 42.Wi6 Ao6 43.Dl3 An4 44.o3 Ao6 45.Ah5 Wi12 46.Rd1 Qc12 47.Rm1 Dn12 48.Ne3 Dn10 49.c4 a9 50.Neg4 Dm9 51.Ni5 l8 52.Nh7 Wl10 53.Kj2 1–0

Game 2
White: sxg  Black: Nick WolffGame Courier 2017
1.f8 i9 2.Ci3 Ci14 3.k8 h10 4.Bc10+ g14 5.g8 Qc11 6.Bd9 Cl14 7.Qa8 An9 8.Ok3 Of10 9.Bi4 Axi4 10.Oxi4 Oxa8 11.g9 h9 12.Bm9 j10 13.Jl4 Jm13 14.Jk7 Jl11 15.l8 k11 16.Jxh9 Oc7 17.Jf12 Of4+ 18.Kj1 Qxf8 19.Aa7 Qxm1+ 20.Dl1 Jxm9 21.lxm9 Cl1+ 0–1
Mate is inevitable.

Endgame
The standard basic checkmates (queen, rook, two bishops, or bishop and knight) can all be forced on the 16×16 board, but they take a longer time to accomplish. For example, while bishop and knight can mate within 33 moves from any winnable position on an 8×8 board, it can take up to 93 moves on a 16×16 board. For example, if White has a king on a1, a knight on b1, and a bishop on c1, while Black has only a king on c2, White can force mate in 92:
1.Bb2 Kb3 2.Bi9 Ka4 3.Kb2 Kb5 4.Kc3 Kc6 5.Kd4 Kd7 6.Ke5 Ke8 7.Kf6 Kf8 8.Kg6 Kg8 9.Bg11 Kf9 10.Kh7 Ke10 11.Kg8 Kf11 12.Bi9 Ke10 13.Kh9 Kd11 14.Kg10 Ke10 15.Bg11 Kd9 16.Kf9 Kc10 17.Ke10 Kc11 18.Ke11 Kc12 19.Nd2 Kd13 20.Ne4 Ke14 21.Nf6 Kf13 22.Kf11 Ke14 23.Ke12 Kd15 24.Kd13 Ke16 25.Ke14 Kd16 26.Nd7 Kc16 27.Ne9 Kb15 28.Kd15 Kb14 29.Bf10+ Kb15 30.Nd11 Ka16 31.Nc13 Kb16 32.Kd16 Ka15 33.Kc15 Ka16 34.Kc16 Ka15 35.Na12+ Ka16 36.Nb14 Ka15 37.Nd13 Ka14 38.Nc11 Ka13 39.Bc13 Ka14 40.Kc15 Ka13 41.Kc14 Ka14 42.Bd12 Ka13 43.Na10 Ka12 44.Kc13 Kb11 45.Nb12 Ka12 46.Kc12 Ka13 47.Be11 Ka12 48.Bf12 Ka13 49.Bc15 Ka12 50.Nd11 Ka11 51.Bf12 Ka12 52.Nc13 Ka11 53.Kc11 Ka10 54.Nd11 Ka9 55.Nb10 Kb9 56.Kb11 Ka9 57.Kc10 Ka10 58.Bg13 Ka11 59.Be15 Ka10 60.Nd9 Ka9 61.Bh12 Ka10 62.Nc11+ Ka9 63.Kc9 Ka8 64.Nd9 Kb7 65.Nb8 Ka7 66.Kc8 Ka8 67.Bg11 Ka9 68.Be13+ Ka8 69.Nd7 Ka7 70.Bh10 Ka8 71.Nc9 Ka7 72.Kc7 Ka6 73.Kc6 Ka7 74.Bd6 Ka6 75.Bc5 Ka5 76.Ne8 Ka4 77.Kd5 Kb3 78.Kd4 Kc2 79.Bb4 Kb3 80.Kc5 Ka2 81.Kc4 Kb1 82.Kc3 Kc1 83.Nd6 Kd1 84.Kd3 Kc1 85.Nc4 Kd1 86.Ba5 Kc1 87.Bd2 Kb1 88.Kc3 Ka2 89.Kc2 Ka1 90.Kb3 Kb1 91.Na3+ Ka1 92.Bc3#

A single archbishop, chancellor,  WFA, or superknight (but not rose) can also force checkmate. Two FDs on different colours can force checkmate without their king's help.

The endgame of queen versus rook is drawn on the 16×16 board. (In fact, it is generally won only on 5×5 through 15×15 square boards.)

Sub-variants

Golden age chess on a really big board

Betza also created a second 16×16 variant, which he termed golden age chess on a really big board. He wrote: "This game is designed to create an open position in which development, initiative, and attack are all-important, the positions are too complex to calculate so you must play by intuition, and you never count Pawns -- in other words, a return to the Golden Age!"

The inverted knight in the diagram is the rose from chess on a really big board, and the superknight and archbishop remain the same. The other pieces are as follows:

The shortest possible checkmate is:
1.Wa13 i9 2.Wi13 Ai15 3.Wi12#

The shortest game ending in quadruple check and mate is:
1.Wa3 Np8 2.Wi3 Nxm2 3.Al3 Nk1 4.Bn5 Nxi2 5.Rxi2 i9 6.Rh3 i8 7.Bh5 i7 8.Wi2+ i6 9.Axi6 h14 10.Ad11#

Nine-board chess
Betza also proposed a 24×24 version of chess on a really big board, although he did not fully design it. His description of the game was "Push 9 boards together in a [3×3] square, symmetrically replicate all the unique pieces from the four-board chess lineup, add a W beside the K, two Fs flanking the K [and] W, and you have a game." The W and F are here the wazir and ferz. This description is however not unique: the positions of the roses, superknights, archbishops, chancellors, and queens are not determined, as some of them are equidistant to the king in the four-board chess initial position, and it is not clear if the king should be on the l-file or the m-file. The addition of such weak pieces was intended to balance the duplication of the more powerful pieces.

Four-board Shatranj

Rule changes
Betza remarked that the rules of most chess variants, such as cylindrical chess or avalanche chess, could be applied to chess on a really big board; nonetheless, he considered applying the rules of cylindrical chess to the 16×16 board "silly" because it made distances feel even larger, recommending Avalanche chess instead as it shortens the game. Betza also thought favourably of applying the rules of momentum chess to the 16×16 board. Another possibility Betza mentioned is the rules of Viennese Kriegspiel, where the middle of the board (the line between the 8th and 9th ranks) is blocked by a screen and players can move their pieces freely up to their first six ranks. Once both players are satisfied with their arrangement (this can be enforced with a timer), the screen is removed and normal play resumes. It would also be possible to play without the screen, which Betza called "Sighted Viennese Kriegspiel".

A further possibility Betza entertained was a 3D version of chess on a really big board on a 16×16×16 board, which brought its inspiration full circle. On each level, the 2D setup would be repeated, and the pieces' moves would be translated into three dimensions just as in his idea of 8×8×8 3D chess. Nevertheless, he commented on it: "What an awful idea. Each player has 256 Pawns and 256 pieces. The average length of a game is likely to be more [than] 2000 moves."

Different starting positions
Betza also considered starting positions with 16 (one chess set) or 64 (four sets) pieces instead of 32 (two sets), but eventually rejected them. They are as follows:

Three dimensions
Betza suggested a 16×16×16 three-dimensional adaptation of the rules of chess on a really big board, which would be formed by pushing eight 8×8×8 boards into a cube and then translating the moves into 3D following how he did so for his version of 8×8×8 3D chess, although he expressed reservations about the likely game length.

Unrealised suggestions
Betza also suggested "Four Board Great Chess", which would have more pieces than the rose that could not make their full moves on smaller boards, and having pawns on the third rank and about 24 pieces in the two rows behind them; and similarly, "Four Board Great Shatranj", where the pieces would be weakened further. Another suggestion of his was four-board chess with different armies, suggesting that one player could use knights and the other could use fibnifs (fbNF; makes longest forward or backward moves as knight, or moves as ferz), though noting that creating completely new armies was not possible in 1996 as the values of long-range pieces on 16×16 boards were not yet known to much precision. However, none were developed beyond ideas.

A further variant Betza considered is "Sixty-Four Board Chess", which would be played on a 64×64 board with 4,096 squares (the same as 16×16×16 chess). Betza's comment was:

Similarly, he considered a 64×64×64 3D variant, which he put forward as a possible world record for the largest chess variant (having 262,144 cubes), although he did not completely specify the rules, beyond stating that the standard opening setup for orthodox chess would simply be repeated to fill the 64×64 boards.

Notes

References

Chess variants
Fairy chess
1996 in chess
Board games introduced in 1996